WSPX-TV (channel 56) is a television station in Syracuse, New York, United States, airing programming from the Ion Television network. Owned and operated by the Ion Media subsidiary of the E. W. Scripps Company, the station maintains studios on Basile Rowe in East Syracuse and a transmitter on Sevier Road in Pompey, New York.

History

WSPX-TV has been operating since November 24, 1998. From 2001 to 2005, WSPX re-aired newscasts from NBC affiliate WSTM-TV (channel 3).

Technical information

Subchannels
The station's digital signal is multiplexed:

WSPX-TV started broadcasting in high definition in May 2010.

The channel 15 frequency was short-spaced to Belleville, Ontario's CBLFT-13 and was approved on the condition that the effective radiated power of the U.S. station not exceed 100 kilowatts.

According to WSPX-TV, an early reduction in analogue power and start of digital operation needed to take place months in advance of the February 17, 2009, FCC digital transition deadline to ensure that channel 15's antenna could be installed on the top of the tower in place of the existing channel 56 antenna before the onset of winter. UHF 56 was then left operational from a secondary, side-mounted antenna at a 25% reduction in coverage area until analogue shut-off.

Analog-to-digital conversion
WSPX-TV shut down its analog signal, over UHF channel 56, on June 12, 2009, the official date in which full-power television stations in the United States transitioned from analog to digital broadcasts under federal mandate. The station's digital signal remained on its pre-transition UHF channel 15. Through the use of PSIP, digital television receivers display the station's virtual channel as its former UHF analog channel 56, which was among the high band UHF channels (52–69) that were removed from broadcasting use as a result of the transition.

References

External links

Ion Television affiliates
Court TV affiliates
Grit (TV network) affiliates
Ion Mystery affiliates
Defy TV affiliates
TrueReal affiliates
Scripps News affiliates
E. W. Scripps Company television stations
Television channels and stations established in 1998
1998 establishments in New York (state)
SPX-TV